The 1996 All-Big Ten Conference football team consists of American football players chosen as All-Big Ten Conference players for the 1996 NCAA Division I-A football season.  The conference recognizes two official All-Big Ten selectors: (1) the Big Ten conference coaches selected separate offensive and defensive units and named first- and second-team players (the "Coaches" team); and (2) a panel of sports writers and broadcasters covering the Big Ten also selected offensive and defensive units and named first- and second-team players (the "Media" team).

Offensive selections

Quarterbacks
 Steve Schnur, Northwestern (Coaches-1; Media-1)
 Matt Sherman, Iowa (Coaches-2)
 Todd Schultz, Michigan St. (Media-2)

Running backs
 Darnell Autry, Northwestern (Coaches-1; Media-1)
 Ron Dayne, Wisconsin (Coaches-2; Media-1)
 Sedrick Shaw, Iowa (Coaches-1 tie)
 Curtis Enis, Penn State (Coaches-1 [tie])
 Robert Holcombe, Illinois (Coaches-2 [tie]; Media-2)
 Pepe Pearson, Ohio State (Coaches-2 [tie]; Media-2)

Centers
 Rod Payne, Michigan (Coaches-1; Media-1)
 Juan Porter, Ohio State (Coaches-2; Media-2)

Guards
 Justin Chabot, Northwestern (Coaches-1; Media-1)
 Damon Denson, Michigan (Coaches-1; Media-2)
 Jamie Vanderveldt, Wisconsin (Media-1)
 Emmett Zitelli, Purdue (Coaches-2; Media-2)
 Zack Adami, Michigan (Coaches-2)

Tackles
 Orlando Pace, Ohio St. (Coaches-1; Media-1)
 Ross Verba, Iowa (Coaches-1; Media-1)
 Jerry Wunsch, Wisconsin (Coaches-2; Media-2)
 Flozell Adams, Michigan St. (Coaches-2; Media-2)

Tight ends
 Jerame Tuman, Michigan  (Coaches-1; Media-1)
 Keith Olsommer, Penn State (Coaches-2; Media-2)

Receivers
 D'Wayne Bates, Northwestern (Coaches-1; Media-1)
 Brian Alford, Purdue (Coaches-1; Media-1)
 Tim Dwight, Iowa (Coaches-2; Media-2)
 Derrick Mason, Michigan St. (Coaches-2)
 Ryan Thelwell, Minnesota (Media-2)

Defensive selections

Defensive linemen
 William Carr, Michigan (Coaches-1; Media-1)
 Matt Finkes, Ohio State (Coaches-1; Media-1 [tie])
 Mike Vrabel, Ohio State (Coaches-1; Media-1)
 Tarek Saleh, Wisconsin (Coaches-1; Media-1)
 Jared DeVries, Iowa (Coaches-2; Media-1 [tie])
 Luke Fickell, Ohio State (Coaches-2; Media-2)
 Brandon Noble, Penn State (Coaches-2; Media-2)
 David Bowens, Michigan (Coaches-2; Media-2)
 Matt Rice, Northwestern (Coaches-2)
 Nate Davis, Indiana (Media-2)

Linebackers
 Pat Fitzgerald, Northwestern (Coaches-1; Media-1)
 Jarrett Irons, Michigan (Coaches-1; Media-1)
 Andy Katzenmoyer, OSU (Coaches-1 [tie]; Media-1)
 Pete Monty, Wisconsin (Coaches-1 [tie]; Media-2)
 Greg Bellisari, Ohio State (Coaches-2; Media-2)
 Chike Okeafor, Purdue (Coaches-2)
 Aaron Collins, Penn State (Coaches-2)
 Broderick Hall, Minnesota(Media-2)

Defensive backs
 Kim Herring, Penn State (Coaches-1; Media-1)
 Shawn Springs, Ohio State (Coaches-1; Media-1)
 Charles Woodson, Michigan (Coaches-1; Media-1)
 Damien Robinson, Iowa (Coaches-2; Media-1)
 Brian Miller, Penn State  (Coaches-1)
 Eric Collier, Northwestern (Coaches-2; Media-2)
 Tom Knight, Iowa (Coaches-2; Media-2)
 Eric Allen, Indiana (tie) (Coaches-2; Media-2)
 Marcus Ray, Michigan (tie) (Coaches-2)
 Damon Moore, Ohio State (Media-2)

Special teams

Kickers
 Brett Conway, Penn State (Coaches-1; Media-1)
 John Hall, Wisconsin (Coaches-2; Media-2)

Punters
 Nick Gallery, Iowa (Coaches-1; Media-1)
 Paul Burton, Northwestern (Coaches-2)
 Alan Sutkowski, Indiana (Media-2)

Key

See also
1996 College Football All-America Team

References

All-Big Ten Conference
All-Big Ten Conference football teams